John Daniell (born 1972) was born in New Zealand, and educated both there and in England. After studying English at the University of Oxford, he worked as a journalist for Radio New Zealand and Capital Television.

Rugby career
His early rugby career included playing for England Schoolboys (1990), New Zealand Under 19s (1991), New Zealand Colts (1992), Marist St Pats (1992–97), Oxford University (Blue, 1992–1994) and Wellington Lions (1994–96). In 1996 he turned professional, playing for French clubs Racing (Racing Club de France) (1997–2000), Perpignan (USA Perpignan) (2000–2003), and Montpellier (Montpellier Hérault RC) (2003–2006).

Journalism
Currently a freelance journalist, he has been published in The Observer, The Sunday Telegraph, Financial Times, The Times, The Evening Post, The New Zealand Listener, L'Equipe and Le Monde.

Publications
 Inside French Rugby: Confessions of a Kiwi Mercenary (2007), Awa Press 
 Confessions of a Rugby Mercenary (2009), Ebury Press 
2009 William Hill Sports Book of the Year shortlist
2010 British Sports Book Awards (Best Rugby Book)

References

External links
Confessions of a Rugby Mercenary, Ebury Publishing
One in the eye for Perpignan – John Daniell, Financial Times 12 Dec 2008
Tonga's gentle giants turn their eyes on England – John Daniell, Guardian 26 Sept 2007

1972 births
Living people
New Zealand rugby union players
New Zealand journalists
USA Perpignan players
Montpellier Hérault Rugby players
Rugby historians and writers